Sharon Katharine Van Etten (born February 26, 1981) is an American singer-songwriter. She has released six studio albums, the latest of which is We've Been Going About This All Wrong (2022).

Early life 
Van Etten was born in Belleville, New Jersey, the middle child of four. She lived in Nutley, New Jersey, then moved to Clinton, New Jersey as a pre-teen. She attended North Hunterdon High School, at which she participated in the chorus and performed in stage musicals.

Later, she moved to Murfreesboro, Tennessee to attend Middle Tennessee State University and studied recording, but dropped out after a year. She ended up working at the Red Rose, a coffee and record shop and music venue in Murfreesboro for about five years. She fell into an abusive relationship with a rock musician who discouraged her from writing songs. After five years, she left in the middle of the night with whatever she could carry.

She lived in Brooklyn for a number of years, in the suburban neighborhood of Ditmas Park.

Career 

Van Etten self-released handmade CDs until 2009, when her debut studio recording was released. Before her studio debut, she worked at Astor Wines and as a publicist at Ba Da Bing Records.

2009: Because I Was in Love 
Van Etten's debut, Because I Was in Love, was released on May 26, 2009, on Language of Stone, and was manufactured and distributed by Drag City. Because I Was in Love was produced by Greg Weeks at Hexham Head studio in Philadelphia.

2010: epic 
On September 21, 2010, Van Etten released her second album, epic, on Ba Da Bing Records. With no set band at the time, Van Etten called on friends Jeffrey Kish, Dave Hartley, Jessica Larrabee, and Andy LaPlant of She Keeps Bees, Cat Martino, Meg Baird, Jim Callan, and Brian Christinzio. The first song recorded for the album was "Love More", recorded in December 2009 by producer Brian McTear for Weathervane Music's Shaking Through documentary video series. The remainder of the album was produced by Brian McTear with engineer Amy Morrissey in May 2010 at Miner Street Recordings in Philadelphia. NPR described it as possessing "a fuller sound compared to the super-spare arrangements on her first two self-produced albums, but epic still feels incredibly intimate, with lots of room to breathe and unfold."

2012: Tramp 

Van Etten's third studio album, Tramp, was released on February 7, 2012, on Jagjaguwar. Tramp was produced by The National's Aaron Dessner and recorded in his home studio in Brooklyn, New York. Additional recording took place at Miner Street Recordings in Philadelphia, where the album was also mixed with Engineers and Mixers Brian McTear and Jonathan Low. The album features musicians Doug Keith, Thomas Bartlett, Bryan Devendorf, Bryce Dessner, Matt Barrick, Rob Moose, Julianna Barwick, Peter Silberman, Logan Coale, Clarice Jensen, Ben Lanz, Zach Condon, and Jenn Wasner.

2014–2015: Are We There 
May 2014 brought about the release of Van Etten's fourth studio album, titled Are We There, on Jagjaguwar. Van Etten produced the record with Stewart Lerman, with the guidance of bandmate and manager Zeke Hutchins. Most of the recording was done at Hobo Sound Studios in Weehawken, New Jersey, with piano tracks being recorded at Electric Lady Studios in New York City. The record features musicians Zeke Hutchins, Doug Keith, Heather Woods Broderick, Dave Hartley, Adam Granduciel, Marisa Anderson, Stuart D. Bogie, Mickey Free, Mary Lattimore, Little Isidor, Jacob Morris, Torres' Mackenzie Scott, Shearwater's Jonathan Meiburg, Lower Dens' Jana Hunter, and Efterklang touring member Peter Broderick. The EP I Don't Want to Let You Down, a compilation of songs that were not included on Are We There, was released on Jagjaguwar in 2015.

2019-present: Remind Me Tomorrow and We've Been Going About This All Wrong
After the release of Are We There, Van Etten took some time away from music. She pursued acting, had a child, and applied to Brooklyn College to study psychology and mental health counseling. Van Etten composed the score for the film Strange Weather, working on the music in a practice space she shared with Michael Cera. In between working on the music for the film she recorded dozens of demos for new songs, which would form the basis for her next album.

In 2018, Van Etten released a new track, "Comeback Kid", and announced her next album Remind Me Tomorrow, released on January 18, 2019. Remind Me Tomorrow was a departure from Van Etten's previous guitar-focused work, featuring more synthesizers, drums, and experimental sounds.

In 2019, Van Etten moved with her son and partner to Los Angeles, California. She stated her desire with the move was to settle down and diversify her career to be less reliant on traveling tours. The COVID-19 pandemic in 2020 scuttled those plans, and during the resulting lockdowns Van Etten wrote songs that focused on her new life as well as the wider political landscape and "collective trauma" people were experiencing.

Van Etten played bass and sang harmony as the three surviving members of Fountains of Wayne performed in a televised benefit with various New Jersey-affiliated musicians to raise funds for COVID-19 relief in April 2020. She filled the role left vacant by the COVID-19-related death of Adam Schlesinger a few weeks earlier. She and the other three members of the band played simultaneously from remote locations. The band played the song "Hackensack" from the album Welcome Interstate Managers.

On May 15, 2020, Van Etten released a cover of (What's So Funny 'Bout) Peace, Love and Understanding? with Queens of the Stone Age frontman Josh Homme.

In October 2020, Van Etten made a song titled "Let Go" for the documentary, Feels Good Man, directed by Arthur Jones about Matt Furie, the creator of Pepe the Frog.

On November 16, 2020, Van Etten released two covers of traditional holiday songs, "Silent Night" and "Blue Christmas".

On May 20, 2021, Van Etten released a single with Angel Olsen, "Like I Used To," which was produced by John Congleton. Olsen and Van Etten appear in the music video with their hair styled in similar shag haircuts.

In 2021 the artist was inter alia part of the Newport Folk Festival in July.

On May 6, 2022, Van Etten released her sixth studio album We've Been Going About This All Wrong.

Influences and musical style 
Van Etten cites Ani DiFranco as a key influence, saying, "She was the first musician I had ever heard whose songs were super confessional. She could really play guitar... That was my first experience with non-pop female musicians. She made me want to start playing more."

Van Etten possesses a contralto vocal range, which Caleb Caldwell of Slant described as "husky". NPR described her vocals as raspy, elegant and luminous, while Consequence called it "earthy". Van Etten's music is characterized by a heavy use of harmonies. Pitchfork described her songs as having "echoes of folk tradition." NPR Music asserts: "Her songs are heartfelt without being overly earnest; her poetry is plainspoken but not overt, and her elegant voice is wrapped in enough rasp and sorrow to keep from sounding too pure or confident." With "Comeback Kid" and Remind Me Tomorrow, Van Etten introduced electronic sounds into her music. She has said, "I listen to a lot of OMD... I'm into a lot of the new post-punk electronic stuff."

Acting 
Since 2016, Van Etten has appeared in both seasons of the Netflix drama The OA as Rachel, a fellow abductee along with Prairie in Dr. Percy's basement lab/terrarium. Rachel and the other captives are subjected to after-life experiments while conspiring over a period of years to possibly escape, and at one point, Rachel sings a song of remembrance. Van Etten also appeared in episode six of the 2017 Twin Peaks series on Showtime.

Van Etten made her feature film debut with a supporting role in the 2020 film Never Rarely Sometimes Always directed by Eliza Hittman, for which she also wrote and performed the original track 'Staring at a Mountain'.

Van Etten also appeared in the 2021 film How It Ends as Jet. The film featured two new songs by Van Etten, "How Much I Loved You" and "Till We Meet Again".

Personal life 
Van Etten had her first child, a son, in 2017 with her romantic partner Zeke Hutchins. Hutchins used to be her drummer and then became her manager. After living in New York City for 15 years, she moved with her family to Los Angeles in September 2019.

Discography

Albums

Other contributions 
 The Free People short film Rangeen, featuring Freida Pinto, uses Van Etten's song "Love More"
 Lent her voice to the Corona "Find Your Beach" campaign, covering Irving Berlin's "Blue Skies" 
 V Magazine music video collaboration with director and photographer Karen Collins
 Ace and Jig song and model collaboration
 April 2009: "Coming Home", written by Jeremy Joyce, for the feature film Woman's Prison (vocals and guitar)
 August 2009: "Kettering", "Thirteen", "Two", and "Shiva" on Hospice by The Antlers (vocals)
 2010: Van Etten contributes vocals to two tracks on Beirut's album The Rip Tide
 March 2011: "Think You Can Wait" by The National, from the soundtrack to the film Win Win (backing vocals)
 April 2012: "Serpents" was featured in the season 2 finale of Lost Girl, "Flesh and Blood"
 December 2012: A cover of Irving Berlin's "What'll I Do" was recorded with Vince Giordano and the Nighthawks for the season 3 finale of Boardwalk Empire, "Margate Sands"
 December 2012: "Prisoners", with J Mascis, on The Music Is You: A Tribute to John Denver
 January 2013: Van Etten performed at John Cale's tribute to Nico, Life Along the Borderline, at the Brooklyn Academy of Music
 July 2013: "Serpents" was featured in the season 4 trailer for The Walking Dead at Comic-Con
 August 2013: Van Etten designed a limited edition charity T-shirt which was being sold through the Yellow Bird Project to raise money for Women in Need (WIN), a charity that provides safe housing for homeless women and their children in New York City
 January 20, 2014: Writing and performing in the film Song One, starring Anne Hathaway
 February 2014: Producing, recording, and performing a cover of The Flaming Lips' "Do You Realize??" for the Amazon children's TV show Gortimer Gibbon's Life on Normal Street
 November 2014: "Every Time the Sun Comes Up" was used in the Season 3 Elementary episode "The Five Orange Pipz"
 2015: Performed at Sundance Next Festival 
 April 2015: Featured on the song "Sunshine on My Back" by The National, from the Trouble Will Find Me recording sessions
 July 2015: End credit songwriting for the film Tig
 2016: Ace and Jig spring 2016 Fashion Week video, featuring "I Wish I Knew", for Vogue.com Madewell feature
 May 2016: Appeared on the Grateful Dead tribute album Day of the Dead, singing "To Lay Me Down", credited to Perfume Genius, Sharon Van Etten & Friends
 June 2016: "Every Time the Sun Comes Up" is used for the "Wedding" Volvo XC90 automobile television advertisement
 September 2016: Scored the Katherine Dieckmann film Strange Weather, which starred Holly Hunter and appeared at the Toronto International Film Festival. The Hollywood Reporter'''s Jon Frosch praised Van Etten's contributions to the film: "The authentic-feeling Southern ambience, enhanced by Sharon Van Etten's low-key, country-inflected score, is one of the film's most potent assets."
 December 2016: Featured in an acting role as Rachel in The OA, which debuted on Netflix on December 16, 2016
 2017: Her covered version of The End of the World is featured as the lead single of Resistance Radio: The Man in the High Castle Album, a cover album produced by Danger Mouse and Sam Cohen as the companion album of the TV series' reimagining of 60's sound.
 2017: "Tarifa" was performed during the credit sequence of part six of Twin Peaks: The Return 2017: The song "Best I Can" from the film Dina, written and performed by Michael Cera and featuring Van Etten, was unsuccessfully nominated for Best Song in a Documentary at the 2017 Critics' Choice Documentary Awards.
 2017: "Passion and Love" appeared on the Planned Parenthood benefit compilation 7-Inches for Planned Parenthood.
 2018: Performed at the BBC Proms season, singing LCD Soundsystem's "New York, I Love You but You're Bringing Me Down"
 May 2019: Featured on the song "The Pull of You" by The National, from the album I Am Easy to Find.
 June 2019: Performed at the Glastonbury Festival.
2019: Featured song, "Seventeen," in Season 2, Episode 7 of "Sex Education" on Netflix.
2019: Austin City Limits
2020: Featured on the opening track "Lemon" off of Local Natives EP, Sour Lemon.
2020: Featured on the title track "Impossible Weight" by Deep Sea Diver – #29 Adult Alternative Songs
2020: Featured song, "Comeback Kid," in "Spinning Out" on Netflix.
2021: Featured on "Sad Mezcalita" by Xiu Xiu, the opener on their album OH NO.
2021: Featured on the track "Nest" off of Jomoro's album Blue Marble Sky.''
2021: Featured songs, "Seventeen," "Let Go," "Serpents," "Peace Signs," and "Every Time the Sun Comes Up" in Season 1 of "Maid" on Netflix.
2022: Features on the Superchunk song "If You're Not Dark" from the album Wild Loneliness

Notes

Awards and nominations

References

External links
 
 

American people of Flemish descent
American rock singers
American folk singers
Living people
1981 births
North Hunterdon High School alumni
People from Belleville, New Jersey
People from Clinton, New Jersey
People from Nutley, New Jersey
Musicians from Brooklyn
Singers from New York City
Singer-songwriters from New Jersey
American women singer-songwriters
American indie rock musicians
American women rock singers
American rock songwriters
Jagjaguwar artists
21st-century American women guitarists
21st-century American guitarists
21st-century American women pianists
21st-century American pianists
21st-century American women singers
21st-century American singers
Singer-songwriters from New York (state)
American contraltos